Revelation is a 1924 film starring Viola Dana, Monte Blue, and Lew Cody. The film was directed and written by George D. Baker and based upon a popular novel, The Rosebud of a Thousand Years. Dana was one of the top stars of the newly amalgamated MGM, a lively comedian who enjoyed a long career that faded with the emergence of the talkies. In 1918, Metro Pictures (now called MGM) filmed Revelation again, starring Alla Nazimova and again directed by Baker.

Plot
Joline Hofer (Viola Dana) is a profligate Montmartre dancer who left her illegitimate child in a convent. Paul Granville (Monte Blue) is an American artist who becomes smitten by the dancer, and uses her for his portraits of great women. When one of Paul's paintings, of the Madonna, appears to result in a miracle, Joline's life is changed forever, as she reforms, reclaims her child, and marries the artist.

Cast
 Viola Dana - Joline Hofer
 Monte Blue - Paul Granville
 Marjorie Daw - Mademoiselle Brevoort
 Lew Cody - Count Adrian de Roche
 Frank Currier - Prior
 Edward Connelly - Augustin
 Kathleen Key - Madonna
 Ethel Wales - Madame Hofer
 George Siegmann - Hofer
 Otto Matieson - Du Clos
 Bruce Guerin - Jean Hofer

Preservation status
This film has been preserved by MGM.

Citations

External links

1924 films
American silent feature films
American black-and-white films
Metro-Goldwyn-Mayer films
1924 drama films
Films directed by George D. Baker
Silent American drama films
1920s American films